Jean-Claude Pomonti (born 27 April 1940) is a French journalist specializing in Southeast Asia.

Biography 
Jean-Claude Pomonti discovered Southeast Asia which became his favorite field during a trip in 1965. He returned to the newspaper Le Monde in 1974 as correspondent in Bangkok from where he covered the Vietnam War.

His criticisms of the Phnom Penh and Saigon regimes resulted in repeated bans on his stay in the Khmer republic and in the Republic of Vietnam.

His work allowed him, however, in 1973, to win the Albert Londres Prize. The following year, he was transferred to Nairobi where, for the same daily, he would cover East Africa until 1979, when he joined the Africa department at the headquarters of the newspaper in Paris. In 1985, he became deputy head of the foreign service in charge of Asia, before returning to Bangkok in 1991, again as correspondent.

Bibliography

References

External links 
 Jean-Claude Pomonti 23 articles on Slate
 Le journaliste Jean-Claude Pomonti dévoile Hanoi et ses mutations on Le Petit Journal
 J-Claude Pomonti on La revue des ressources
 Jean-Claude Pomonti se replonge dans le Vietnam on the site of Prix Albert Londres
 Jean-Claude Pomonti on Le Monde Diplomatique

20th-century French journalists
21st-century French journalists
Albert Londres Prize recipients
1940 births
Living people